Vitis is a genus of about 60 species of plants in the flowering plant family Vitaceae

Vitis can also refer to:

 vine staff, the centurion's rod used for discipline in the Roman army
 Vitis, Austria
 Vitis, Peru and Vitis District, a town and a district of the province Yauyos
 VITIS, or the Krastyo Sarafov National Academy for Theatre and Film Arts, in Sofia, Bulgaria
 Vitis, the Latin name for the Montone

See also
 Vitus (disambiguation)